Íkaro Valderrama Ortiz (born July 17, 1984 in Sogamoso) is a Colombian singer, writer, composer and multi-instrumentalist.  His musical and literary work has influences from Siberia, India and Latin America. He defines himself as a kind of Modern Nomad, open to explore different geographies, traditions and rhythms. Therefore, his art is an intersection of multiple influences and experiences. Since 2009 he has been living in a transit between many countries of Latin America and Siberia, assimilating the cultural heritage and developing a unique style of music. Íkaro has studied different kinds and techniques of singing, and he plays a wide range of musical instruments from different countries.

As a writer, his anthology of short stories and short shorts Cuentos de minicuentos undoubtedly establishes him as a master of the genre in recent Colombian literature.

Published works 
 La Ciencia Métrica de los Placeres (The metric Science of Pleasures)
 Cuentos de Minicuentos.
 Ventanas del Silencio  (Windows of Silence).
 Siberia en tus ojos (Siberia into your eyes)

Discography 
 TransBaikal 2.1 (2014)
 Sonido Nómada. With the singer from Altai Republic, Arina Tadyrova (2013)

References
 4. http://gayanat.blogspot.ru/2014/09/ikaro-valderrama-nomad-that-is.html

External links 
 Sitio oficial
 Sitio en SoundCloud.
 Sitio en Facebook.

Colombian songwriters
Male songwriters
Living people
1984 births